National Fruits & Veggies Month is a national observance and awareness campaign held in the United States during the month of September to educate about the health benefits of eating fruits and vegetables and to celebrate in song and culture how they are grown, distributed, and consumed.  The awareness campaign consists of outreach to grocery stores and retailers and to schools and public organizations, outreach to nutritionists and other health professionals, weekly online contests with prizes, social media campaigns and logowear, and other special events during September to celebrate National Fruits & Veggies Month and inspire people to regularly consume fruits and vegetables and to create a more balanced lifestyle.  The 'Take the Have A Plant pledge' is to "add one more fruit or vegetable to your routine, everyday this month." The year-long campaign surrounding 'Have a Plant' has monthly educational themes to be implemented by their Fruit and Vegetable Ambassadors in Action (FVAA) network.

The event is sponsored by the Produce for Better Health Foundation (PBH) as part of the PBH Have A Plant Movement, which "Aims to Transform the Way Millennials and Gen Z Approach Fruits and Vegetables, to Change Behaviors and Boost Consumption" (according to its website).  The PBH Have A Plant consumer movement replaces their previous Fruits & Veggies-More Matters public education program.  The 2019 NFVM theme is "Have A Plant – Food Rooted In A Better Mood" and is supported with printed and downloadable literature. 

National Nutrition Month follows six months later in March of each year.

Annual NFVM themes 
 2019 - "Have A Plant – Food Rooted In A Better Mood" 
 2020 - Have A Plant Nation
 2022 - Celebrating The Roots Of Our Food

References

External links 
 Have A Plant Campaign website
 Produce For Better Health Foundation Unveils Innovative Consumer Movement To Promote Fruits And Vegetables For Happier And Healthier Lives.  CISION PRNewswire, April 23, 2019
 PBH website for enrolling individual participants in the Have A Plant Pledge
 PBH brings Chicago-based food and nutrition influencers to United Fresh.  The Produce News. June 7, 2019
 Major M. Produce for Better Health Debuts ‘Have a Plant': Foundation repositions tagline to spark a consumer movement to promote fruits and vegetables. WinSight Grocery Business. Apr. 24, 2019
 Facebook page for PBH Have a Plant Campaign
 Sound Bites Podcast Episode 123: Have a Plant – The Roots of Healthy Eating – Wendy Reinhardt Kapsak, MS, RDN, President & CEO of the Produce for Better Health Foundation. July 10, 2019
 Nickle A. Where shoppers are with plant-based and the opportunity for produce. April 23, 2019
 Produce For Better Health Foundation 2022 National Fruits & Veggies Month Toolkit Makes it Easy to Promote Fruits & Vegetables This September

September observances
Month-long observances
Health observances
Health campaigns
Health in the United States
Food and drink in the United States